State Highway 3 (SH 3)  is a state highway in the U.S. state of Texas that runs from Interstate 45 in Houston near William P. Hobby Airport to State Highway 146,  northwest of Galveston. For most of its length, SH 3 parallels I-45 and runs alongside the former Galveston, Houston and Henderson Railroad lines.

Route description
SH 3 begins in Galveston County, south of La Marque near the Texas City Industrial Complex at a junction with SH 146.  The highway heads to the northwest through La Marque intersecting FM 519 and FM 1765 before an interchange with FM 1764 (Emmett F. Lowry Expressway).  The highway roughly parallels to the east of I-45 as it heads towards Dickinson.  In Dickinson, the highway intersects FM 517 and FM 646 (future SH 99) before entering the League City city limits.  In League City, SH 3 has junctions with SH 96 and FM 518, and head northwest into Harris County.

The first junction in Harris County is with NASA Road 1, which provides access to the Lyndon B. Johnson Space Center.  The highway continues to the northwest to an intersection with FM 2351 and passes along the western boundary of Ellington Field.  Heading northwest, the highway enters Houston city limits and has a junction with Beltway 8 (Sam Houston Tollway).  The highway continues to the northwest through South Houston until it reaches an intersection with Winkler Drive.  The highway turns to the west and follows Winkler Drive to its northern terminus at an interchange with I-45.

History

SH 3 was one of the original twenty five state highways proposed on June 21, 1917, overlaid on top of the Southern National Highway. From 1917, the routing followed present day U.S. Highway 90,  from Orange to Houston, U.S. Highway 90 Alternate to Eagle Lake, FM 102 to Columbus, U.S. Highway 90 to Waelder, SH 97 to Gonzales, U.S. Highway 90 Alternate to Seguin, and U.S. Highway 90 through San Antonio to Del Rio. On August 15, 1917, a more direct route along current US 90 between Waelder and Seguin was proposed. On November 21, 1917, the route was decided to go through Gonzales. On February 20, 1918, an alternate route from Seguin through Harwood to Waelder was added. The road at this time also had numerous alternate routes simultaneously marked as SH 3, along with occasionally signed SH 3A routes (although most of those routes were given their own numbers by the 1930s). On August 21, 1923, its route was extended through Sanderson to Alpine, it then headed northwest to Fort Davis, north to Balmorhea, and then west to a final terminus at San Martine, replacing parts of SH 12, SH 17A, and SH 27. 

In 1926, US 90 was routed over SH 3 to Alpine. On May 1, 1931, SH 3 was rerouted from Alpine to end in Van Horn, replacing part of SH 54, with the old route to San Martine transferred to SH 118, SH 17 and SH 27. SH 3 Spur was created on November 18, 1938 from SH 3 to the Uvalde Fish Hatchery. On May 23, 1939, SH 3 Spur was designated to Langtry. While the routes were marked concurrently, on September 26, 1939, SH 3 was truncated to a small route running from Seguin, Gonzales to Waelder. The two routes designated SH 3 Spur became Spur 1 (Uvalde) and Spur 25 (Langtry). On March 28, 1952, the original route ceased to exist. The present day routing was assigned on August 20, 1952.

SH 3 is sometimes referred to as Old Galveston Road, indicating its function as a thoroughfare between Houston and Galveston.

Spur routes
Numerous spur routes were created along the main routing of SH 3, especially during the 1920s:

State Highway 3-A was a state highway proposed on July 9, 1917, splitting from the main route at Houston and roughly parallelling it to the north through La Grange and ending at San Marcos. On October 8, 1917, the routing had changed slightly, now veering further north from La Grange to Bastrop. On December 17, 1918, SH 20 had been rerouted away from Bastrop, so SH 3A extended west to Austin, replacing a portion of SH 20. On August 21, 1923, this routing had been renumbered as SH 71 west of La Grange and SH 73 (now I-10) east of La Grange. SH 3A was reassigned to an alternate routing of SH 3 that was under construction between San Antonio and Waelder. By 1938, the route was limited to the section between Seguin and Waelder, and on September 26, 1939 was transferred to US 90.

State Highway 3-B  was a spur route created on March 19, 1918. The route crossed the main route of SH 3 at Schulenberg. The route travelled south from Schulenberg through Hallettsville to Cuero. On March 17, 1919, SH 3-B extended north through La Grange to Caldwell. On March 18, 1919, a split travelling both southwest to Kenedy and south to Goliad was added. On August 21, 1923, the route was renumbered as SH 72, which was shortened to end in Cuero with the branches south of Cuero cancelled. (parts later US 77).

State Highway 3-C was designated on March 17, 1919 as a proposed spur off of SH 3A, splitting at Fayetteville and traveling northeast through Bellville and Hempstead to Houston. On August 21, 1923, it was cancelled. On July 28, 1924, it was restored, but as SH 73A, on meeting the conditions. On July 27, 1925, it was taken over. (SH 73A became SH 159 on March 19, 1930).

State Highway 3-D was designated on August 21, 1922 as a spur that connected the main route and SH 3A between La Grange and Columbus. On August 21, 1923, the route was still under construction, but had been renumbered as SH 71.

State Highway 3-E was another spur from Uvalde to La Pryor designated on July 16, 1923. On August 21, 1923, it was renumbered as part of SH 55.

Major intersections

References

External links

003
Greater Houston
Galveston Bay Area
Transportation in Galveston County, Texas
Transportation in Harris County, Texas
U.S. Route 90